Bernadette Beauvais (born 18 June 1949) is a French politician who was Member of Parliament for Seine-et-Marne's 6th constituency for a month in 2021.

A month after replacing Jean-François Parigi, she resigned from Parliament, opting to serve as Mayor of Étrépilly instead.

References 
Living people
1949 births
Members of Parliament for Seine-et-Marne
21st-century French women politicians
The Republicans (France) politicians
Deputies of the 15th National Assembly of the French Fifth Republic

Women mayors of places in France